Eber Baker (April 27, 1780 – October 6, 1864), Marion, Ohio can be credited as being the founder of Marion, Ohio. Baker was born in either Litchfield or Bowdoin, Maine.

Baker and his first wife, Lydia Smith Baker, came to the vicinity of what is now Marion settling in two squatters log cabins near the south side of the plat. Eber Baker is a man of means and buy's 160 acres for $310, April 3, 1822 as found in an affidavit where the site of Marion was to be founded. Alexander Holmes, DS, is contacted by Mr. Baker, makes the first plat for Marion. Holmes draws up and is signed by himself and Eber Baker on April 3, 1822 as it was witnessed. The plat was then received and recorded by the Delaware County Recorder April 18, 1822. Samuel Holmes a practical surveyor, was employed by Mr. Baker to survey the village plat. Samuel was a brother of Alexander Holmes. Eber Baker became agent (Proprietor) for selling off the village lots from the first town plat of Marion. The squatters log cabin was about 1/4 mile north of Jacobs Well, a natural spring well that had been dug during the War of 1812 by Jacob Foos, a surveyor for General William Henry Harrison.

The town plat was named Marion after its newly formed county of the same name, which itself was named for Revolutionary War General Francis Marion.  The village of Marion was then chosen as the county seat of government, beating out nearby Claridon, Ohio to the east. A local middle school was named after Baker, serving in two Buildings until a school district realignment in the 2000s.

Baker would go on to serve in the Ohio House of Representatives. He also constructed and operated the Mansion House, in downtown Marion.

External sources
Genealogy of Eber Baker compiled by Marge McGrew
An abstract of 25 pages dated December 11, 1906, Marion, Ohio records Eber Baker's purchase of the 160 acres.

1780 births
1864 deaths
Members of the Ohio House of Representatives
People from Litchfield, Maine
People from Marion, Ohio
19th-century American politicians
People from Sagadahoc County, Maine